Assertion or assert may refer to:

Computing
 Assertion (software development), a computer programming technique
 assert.h, a header file in the standard library of the C programming language
 Assertion definition language, a specification language providing a formal grammar to specify behaviour and interfaces for computer software

Logic and language
 Logical assertion, a statement that asserts that a certain premise is true
 Proof by assertion, an informal fallacy in which a proposition is repeatedly restated
 Time of assertion, in linguistics a secondary temporal reference in establishing tense
 Assertive, a speech act that commits a speaker to the truth of the expressed proposition

Other uses
 Assert (horse) (1979–1995), an Irish racehorse
 Assertions (auditing), the set of information that the statement preparer is providing in a financial statement audit

See also